Reptilisocia tarica is a species of moth of the family Tortricidae. It is found in Papua New Guinea.

The wingspan is about 13 mm. The costa and termen are mostly yellow, but a small area is ferruginous cream, dotted with brown and edged with grey-brown. There is a cream spot between the end of the median cell and the dorsum. The hindwings are white cream, slightly tinged with brownish at the apex.

References

Moths described in 2012
Tortricini
Moths of Papua New Guinea
Taxa named by Józef Razowski